Vladimir Aleksandrovich Sokoloff (December 26, 1889 – February 15, 1962) was a Russian actor of stage and screen. After studying theatre in Moscow, he began his professional film career in Germany and France during the Silent era, before emigrating to the United States in the 1930s. He appeared in over 100 films and television series, often playing supporting characters of various nationalities and ethnicities.

Early life and education
Sokoloff was born in Moscow, Russian Empire, to a German Jewish family. He was raised bilingual, speaking both Russian and German. He studied theatre in Moscow, first at the Moscow State University and later at the Russian Academy of Theatre Arts, graduating in 1913. At one point a pupil of Constantin Stanislavski, he would later reject Method acting (as well as all other acting theories).

Career 
Upon graduation, he joined the Moscow Art Theatre as an actor and assistant director. Later in the decade, he joined the Kamerny Theatre. In the early 1923, he toured with his troupe in Germany, where he met theatre director and producer Max Reinhardt, who invited him to stay in Berlin. He appeared in numerous stage productions, and began acting in German and Austrian films, including The Love of Jeanne Ney (1927), The Ship of Lost Souls (1929), Farewell (1930), and Darling of the Gods (1930).

With the rise of Nazism, the Jewish Sokoloff moved first to Paris in 1932, where he continued to act on stage and screen. In 1937, he emigrated to the United States. Although he spoke very little English at the time of his arrival, his first stage role there was a lead in Georg Büchner's play Danton's Death, under the direction of Orson Welles. Welles insisted that it would be demeaning for an actor of Sokoloff's reputation to play a small role and personally coached him in his English for the role, which he did phonetically. It was said that Welles was in awe of him and frequently asked him about his career in the Moscow Arts Theatre.

That same year, he had his English-language breakthrough starring in fellow expat William Dieterle's The Life of Emile Zola, portraying Paul Cézanne. He appeared in a number of Broadway plays from 1937 to 1950. He also quickly found work in American films, playing characters of a wide variety of nationalities (he himself once estimated 35), for example, Filipino (Back to Bataan), French (Passage to Marseille), Greek (Mr. Lucky), Arab (Road to Morocco), Romanian (I Was a Teenage Werewolf), and Chinese (Macao). Among his better known parts are the Spanish guerrilla Anselmo in For Whom the Bell Tolls (1943) and the Mexican Old Man in The Magnificent Seven.

In the late 1950s and early 1960s, he also appeared on a number of television series, including three episodes of CBS's The Twilight Zone ("Dust", "The Gift" and "The Mirror"). On January 1, 1961, Sokoloff guest starred as "Old Stefano", a wise shepherd, in the ABC/Warner Brothers western series Lawman, with John Russell and Peter Brown. He also appeared on one episode of The Untouchables entitled "Troubleshooter".

His final roles were in Escape from Zahrain and Taras Bulba, both of which starred Yul Brynner. Both films were released posthumously.

Death 
After a long career, he died of a stroke in 1962 in Hollywood, California.

Partial stage credits

Filmography

Television credits

References

External links
 
  
 
 

1889 births
1962 deaths
American people of Russian-Jewish descent
Burials at Hollywood Forever Cemetery
Emigrants from the Russian Empire to Germany
Jewish American male actors
Male actors from Los Angeles
Male actors from Moscow
Russian male film actors
Russian male silent film actors
Russian male stage actors
White Russian emigrants to Germany
White Russian emigrants to the United States
20th-century American male actors
20th-century Russian male actors